Bulbus fragilis is a species of predatory sea snail, a marine gastropod mollusk in the family Naticidae, the moon snails.

Distribution
This marine species was found in Baffin Bay, Canada.

References

 Récluz, C., 1852. Description de plusieurs coquilles nouvelles. Journal de Conchyliologie 3: 408-414
 Brunel, P.; Bosse, L.; Lamarche, G. (1998). Catalogue of the marine invertebrates of the estuary and Gulf of St. Lawrence. Canadian Special Publication of Fisheries and Aquatic Sciences, 126. 405 p

Naticidae
Gastropods described in 1819